Child Evangelism Fellowship (CEF) is an international interdenominational Christian nonprofit organization founded by Jesse Irvin Overholtzer (1877-1955) in 1937, headquartered in Warrenton, Missouri, United States. The organization lists its purpose as teaching the Christian Gospel to children and encouraging children's involvement in local Christian churches. It has programs established in all US states and in 192 countries, with 733 full-time workers in the US, an estimated 40,000 volunteers in the US and Canada, and over 1,200 missionaries overseas, approximately 1,000 of them national workers, individuals trained with CEF but local to the country of their service. During the reporting year ending December 2014, CEF reported teaching more than 19.9 million children, mostly through face-to-face ministry. CEF is a charter member of the Evangelical Council for Financial Accountability (ECFA).

CEF branched to Europe in 1947 when Bernard and Harriet Swanson (from USA) began work in Gothenburg, Sweden. CEF soon spread across Europe, most notably in (Northern) Ireland from 1950. The headquarters of CEF Europe are in Germany, with its missionaries trained at different centers across Europe.

Elk River case
In 2007-2008, Elk River, Minnesota's board of education prohibited Child Evangelism Fellowship from distributing materials during open houses in that district's schools. CEF took the matter to the U.S. District Court, where in February, 2009, Judge Ann Montgomery ruled that the school district's order deprived CEF of its freedom of speech rights. She went on to say that the school district could still prevent the group from distributing materials if it adopted a policy of closing the schools to all such groups, which the school district did in March 2009.

Criticism
In her 2012 book The Good News Club: The Christian Right's Stealth Assault on America's Children, journalist Katherine Stewart criticizes various practices of the Good News Club after-school Bible study program, including young participants being rewarded for recruiting friends of other faiths and denominations whose parents have not enrolled them in the program. She also claimed in an article in The Guardian that the lesson plan for the Old Testament narrative in 1 Samuel 15, describing the divinely ordered slaughter of the Amalekites, is used to justify genocide. However, CEF president Reese Kauffmann responded to her accusations in a letter, stating:

Kauffman's response elicited the following rebuttal:

See also 

Awana
Child evangelism movement

Books

References

External links
CEF official website

Christian organizations based in the United States
Youth organizations based in Missouri
Christian organizations established in 1937
1937 establishments in Missouri
Evangelism